Players born on or after 1 January 1984 were eligible to participate in the tournament. Players' age as of 16 July 2003 – the tournament's opening day. Players in bold have later been capped at full international level.

Group A

Head coach:  Paolo Berrettini

Head Coach :  Ralf Loose

Head coach:  Egil Olsen

Head coach:  Carlos Alberto Lopes Dinis

Group B

Head Coach :  Paul Gludovatz

Head Coach :  Michal Bílek

Head coach:  Stuart Baxter

Head Coach :  René Girard

Footnotes

UEFA European Under-19 Championship squads
squads